Periyapattinam is a large village located in the eastern part (Gulf of Mannar) of Ramanathapuram district, Tamil Nadu, India. The inhabitants of this village are primarily Tamil Muslim.

History 

This place is one of the historic ports of Eastern (Gulf of Mannar) from 21 km distance of Ramanathapuram where Ibn Battuta, Marco Polo and other famous travellers visited. ibn Battuta mentioned this place as Fattan at his book Rihla.The port was called Parakirama Pattinam in the 10th century. 
 
In the 12th century, it was called Pavitra Manicka Pattinam. It was also called Ta Pa Tan by the famous Chinese traveller Wang Ta-Yuan in the 14th century. Now, it is called Periyapattinam, where thousands of Muslims live. Most Muslims consider themselves to be settler descendants of maritime traders who had business linking the Persian Gulf to the south Indian coast and Southeast Asia.

Demographics

 India census,

Number of Households: 1777

Hospitals

List of Hospitals
 Government Hospital  -Periyapattinam
 Jawahar Hospital# - Ramanathapuram (Dr. Jawahar) from Preiyapattnam
 Government Hospital - Ramanathapuram
 Syed Ammal Trust Hospital - Ramanathapuram
 Pioneer Hospitals (P) Ltd - Ramanathapuram
 A.R.Hospital - Ramanathapuram
M.G Hospital - Ramanathapuram
 Sathya Hospital- Ramanathapuram

Education 

Notable schools

Government higher secondary school, Periyapattinam(1970 onwards) - Periyapattinam 
Al Ameen Matriculation School(1986onwards) - Periyapattinam
Al Kalam Matriculation School - Periyapattinam
National Academy Matriculation School, Ramanathapuram - Ramanathapuram
MG Public Matriculation School, Ramanathapuram
Periyapattinam Higher Secondary School
Syed Ammal Matriculation School - Ramanathapuram
Nabeesa Ammal Matric Higher Secondary School - Ramanathapuram
Allwin Matric hr.sec School - Ramanathapuram
Velumanickam Matriculation school - Vani-Ramanathapuram

Notable colleges
Mohamed Sathak Engineering College - Kilakarai
Syed Hameedha Arts and Science College - Ramanathapuram
Syed Ammal Engineering College - Ramanathapuram

Rashidiya Women Islamic College for Women - Periyapattinamhr.sec
Caussanel College Of Arts & Science - Muthupettai, Periyapattinam
Thasim Beevi Abdul Kadher College for Women Kilakarai
Mohamed Sathak Polytechnic College - Kilakarai
Syed Ammal Arts and Science college - Ramanathapuram

Cuisine
The food habits practised by the Periyapattinam people have similarities with Sri Lankan Tamil Muslim cuisine and Malay cuisine. For example, foods like vatlappam, Idiyappam are probably from Sri Lanka. Most of the dietary practices of people of Periyapattinam follow that of coastal dwellers i.e. seafood dependence.

Other foods include:
Fish Kulambu (Fish Curry), 
Karuvattu Aanam( Dryfish curry), 
Thengai Paal Rasam & Paal Puliyaanam (Coconut Milk Rasam),
Prawns,
and Crab.
Vattalappam is a famous dish eaten during Eid and some special occasions.
Suttuppenanchaanam is also a traditional famous dish in this village.

Gallery

References

External links
 http://periyapattinam.com 
 http://wikimapia.org/#lat=9.2674583&lon=78.9052784&z=17&l=0&m=s&v=9
 http://www.tmpolitics.net/ppm/index.htm
 http://periyappattinam.com 

Former capital cities in India
Villages in Ramanathapuram district
Dargahs in India